Pseudacraea annakae, the montane false acraea, is a butterfly in the family Nymphalidae. It is found in Nigeria and Cameroon. The habitat consists of sub-montane forests.

References

Butterflies described in 1988
Limenitidinae